Andhirikan (English: darkness) is a 2020 Maldivian romantic drama film directed by Ali Seezan. Produced by Seezan and Abdulla Shiwaz under S Productions and Maskey Studio, the film stars Seezan, Aminath Rishfa and Sheela Najeeb in pivotal roles.

Premise
Nihan (Ali Seezan), happily married to Aroosha (Sheela Najeeb) manages his own business and is expecting their first child after two miscarriages. However, another miscarriage and the news that she can no longer conceive leads to an emotional despair. Nihan's childhood friend, Leeza keeps providing them with the emotional support and assistance while trying to move on from her complicated relationship with Hashim (Ahmed Saeed). Meanwhile, Leeza's manipulative aunt, Fareedha (Mariyam Shakeela) grasps the opportunity to convince Aroosha to accept Leeza as the second husband of Nihan. However, things take an unexpected turn, when Leeza takes control of their marriage and Nihan prioritizes Leeza over Aroosha.

Cast 
 Ali Seezan as Nihan
 Aminath Rishfa as Leeza
 Sheela Najeeb as Aroosha
 Mohamed Rasheed as Faththaah; Nihan's father
 Mariyam Shakeela as Fareedha
 Ahmed Saeed as Hashim
 Zeenath Abbas as Athika
 Aminath Nisha Rasheed as Aroosha’s friend
 Nazeeh as HR Intern.

Development
The project was announced in August 2019 as Seezan's next directorial venture after Vafaatheri Kehiveriya (2016). Filming commenced on 23 August 2019 in M. Maduvvaree. Shooting was completed on 10 October 2019, about two weeks prior to the initially announced release date. A week after the ticket sales for the film kick-off, the mastering file becomes corrupted, which delayed the post production of the film for months.

Soundtrack

Release
On 19 September 2019, a teaser trailer of Andhirikan was released, announcing the premiere date as 22 October 2019. On 15 October 2019, a week prior to its release date, the production team announced that the film release is delayed indefinitely due to a "corrupted file" in post production. The official trailer of the film was revealed on 1 February 2020, while announcing the release date of film as 4 March 2020. After four shows of the film were screened, it was pulled from the theater due to COVID-19 pandemic.

References

External links
 

2020 films
Maldivian romantic drama films
Films directed by Ali Seezan
2020 romantic drama films
Dhivehi-language films